Estonia uses Eastern European Time (EET) (UTC+02:00) during winter, and Eastern European Summer Time (EEST) (UTC+03:00) during summer. Estonia has observed daylight saving time since 1981. However, it wasn't used in 1989-1996 and 2000–2002.

Before autumn 1940, Eastern European Time was used in Estonia. After incorporation into Soviet Union, Moscow Time was imposed on. Moscow Time was used until 26 March 1989.

References

External links
 Current Local Time in Tallinn

Estonia
Science and technology in Estonia
Geography of Estonia